His Brother's Wife is a 1916 silent American drama film directed by Harley Knoles and starring Carlyle Blackwell and Ethel Clayton. It was distributed by the World Film Company.

Cast
Carlyle Blackwell as Howard Barton
Ethel Clayton as Helen Barton
Paul McAllister as Richard Barton
Charles K. Gerrard

Preservation status
The film exists in the Library of Congress collection.

References

External links

1916 films
American silent feature films
Films directed by Harley Knoles
World Film Company films
American black-and-white films
Silent American drama films
1916 drama films
1910s English-language films
1910s American films